Priyanjali Jain (born 8 October 1991) is an Indian-born cricketer who plays for the United Arab Emirates women's national cricket team. He is a wicketkeeper batter. She made her Twenty20 International debut against Malaysia women's national cricket team on 22 November 2021.

In October 2022, she played for UAE in Women's Twenty20 Asia Cup.

Reference

External links
 

1991 births
Living people
Indian women cricketers
Emirati women cricketers
United Arab Emirates women Twenty20 International cricketers
Indian emigrants to the United Arab Emirates
Indian expatriate sportspeople in the United Arab Emirates